Duke of Coislin (Fr.: duc de Coislin) was a title of nobility in the peerage of France created by Louis XIV of France in 1665 for Armand de Camboust.

List of Dukes of Coislin, 1665—1732

References
 This page is based on this page on French Wikipedia.